Presidential elections are scheduled to be held in Sri Lanka in September 2024, according to the constitution. Incumbent president Ranil Wickremesinghe is eligible to run for a second term, however Wickremesinghe has yet to declare his intention to run.

Candidates

Declared

Sri Lanka Freedom Party

Potential

National People's Power 
Anura Kumara Dissanayaka, former Chief Opposition Whip (2015–2018), former Minister of Agriculture (2004), Member of Parliament for  Colombo Electoral District (2000–present)

Sri Lanka Podujana Peramuna 
Basil Rajapaksa, former Minister of Finance (2021–2022), former Member of Parliament (2007–2010, 2010–2015, 2021–2022)

Samagi Jana Balawegaya 
Sajith Premadasa, Leader of the Opposition (2020–present), Member of Parliament for Colombo Electoral District (2020–present) and Hambantota Electoral District (2000–2020)

Withdrew

Sri Lanka Podujana Peramuna 
Gotabaya Rajapaksa, former President of Sri Lanka (2019–2022)

References

 
Sri Lanka
Presidential elections in Sri Lanka
2024 in Sri Lanka
Sri Lanka